The South Australian Heritage Register, also known as the SA Heritage Register, is a statutory register of historic places in South Australia. It extends legal protection regarding demolition and development under the Heritage Places Act 1993. It is administered by the South Australian Heritage Council.

As a result of the progressive abolition of the Register of the National Estate during the 2000s and the devolution of responsibility for state-significant heritage to state governments, it is now the primary statutory protection for state-level heritage in South Australia.

References

External links
Online Heritage Databases

 
Heritage registers in Australia